The Iron Clew is a novel that was published in 1947 by Phoebe Atwood Taylor writing as Alice Tilton.  It is the eighth and last of the eight Leonidas Witherall mysteries.

Plot summary

Leonidas Witherall, "the man who looks like Shakespeare", is writing the latest adventure of Lieutenant Hazeltine when his housekeeper Mrs. Mullet interrupts to offer her "candied opinion".  He then prepares to leave for a dinner to which he's been invited in his persona as a bank director, held at the home of banker Fenwick Balderston, when he notices that a brown-paper parcel of bank papers has disappeared.  Upon arrival at Balderston's, he finds the banker has been bashed with a bronze bust of Shakespeare.  Assisted by plucky housewife Liz Copley and gang of other assistants, Witherall races around the town of Dalton and tracks down a missing dinosaur footprint, a copy of Tamerlane, the bank documents and the murderer.

Literary significance and criticism
(See Phoebe Atwood Taylor.)  This is the eighth and last Leonidas Witherall mystery novel and it parallels the tone which was maintained in the other seven.  A murder occurs under embarrassing circumstances, and Leonidas forms a motley crew of assistants together in order to track down clues, chase around the town, and solve the mystery.  There is a strong vein of humor and the plot is fast-moving.

The adventures of Leonidas Witherall were a short-lived radio series at about the time of this novel.  In the novels, Witherall is also the author of a radio series and novels about the adventures of stalwart Lieutenant Hazeltine.  Some supporting characters continue between novels; there is always a beautiful girl, a handsome former student, and an intrepid housewife.

1947 American novels
Novels by Phoebe Atwood Taylor